Rainbow Lakes is a census-designated place (CDP) in Parsippany-Troy Hills Township, Morris County, New Jersey, United States. It is in the western part of the township and consists of housing built around Rainbow Lake (or "Rainbow Lakes" on federal maps), plus a zone of commercial buildings to the east of the lakes. It is bordered to the east by Parsippany proper, to the north by the borough of Mountain Lakes, and to the west by Denville Township. The northern edge of the CDP is formed by U.S. Route 46 and the NJ Transit Montclair-Boonton Line, and Interstate 80 forms the southern edge.

Rainbow Lakes was first listed as a CDP prior to the 2020 census.

Demographics

References 

Census-designated places in Morris County, New Jersey
Census-designated places in New Jersey
Parsippany-Troy Hills, New Jersey